Grand Funk (commonly known as The Red Album) is the second studio album by American rock band Grand Funk Railroad. It was released on December 29, 1969, by Capitol Records, just four months after their debut album On Time. Recorded at Cleveland Recording Company, the album was produced by Terry Knight and engineered by Ken Hamann. The album was certified gold by the RIAA, the first for the group. It includes a cover of the Animals' 1966 song "Inside Looking Out", which is still a staple of the band's live concerts.

Grand Funk was originally released by Capitol Records in LP, cassette, 8-track tape, and reel-to-reel configurations. The original reel-to-reel version (manufactured for Capitol/EMI by Ampex) contains edited versions of "Got This Thing on the Move", "Please Don't Worry", "Mr. Limousine Driver" and "Inside Looking Out", the harmonica solo has been deleted, not available elsewhere. The edits on these songs reduce the album's overall running time by approximately five minutes.

In 2002, Grand Funk was remastered on compact disc with bonus tracks and also released in a limited edition box set Trunk of Funk that contained the band's first four albums. The "trunk" has slots for twelve CDs to house the future release of the remaining eight albums that were released by Capitol Records. Also included is a pair of Shinin' On 3-D glasses, a guitar pick and a sticker reproducing a concert ticket.

Track listing
All songs written and composed by Mark Farner, except where noted.

Personnel

 Mark Farner – guitars, keyboards, harmonica, lead vocals
 Mel Schacher – bass
 Don Brewer – drums, lead vocals

Charts
Album

Singles

References

1969 albums
Grand Funk Railroad albums
Albums produced by Terry Knight
Capitol Records albums